Hwan is a rare Korean family name, as well as an element in Korean given names. Its meaning differs based on the hanja used to write it.

Family name
As a family name, Hwan is written with only one hanja, the Sino-Korean name of the Sapindus mukorossi tree (굳셀 환 ). The 2000 South Korean census found 157 people with this family name. People with this family name include:

Thomas Hwan, South Korean actor based in Denmark

Given name

Hanja
There are 21 hanja with the reading "hwan" on the South Korean government's official list of hanja which may be registered for use in given names; they are:

 (기쁠 환 ): "happiness"
 (근심 환 ): "anxiety"
 (둥글 환 ): "round"
 (바꿀 환 ): "to change"
 (고리 환 ): "ring"
 (돌아올 환 ): "to return"
 (부를 환 ): "to summon"
 (빛날 환 ): "to shine"
 (흩어질 환 ): "to be scattered"
 (불꽃 환 ): "blaze"
 (환할 환 ): "bright"
 (헛보일 환 ): "illusion"
 (굳셀 환 ): Sapindus mukorossi
 (고리 환 ): "ring"
 (기뻐할 환 ): "to rejoice"
 (벼슬 환 ): "government officials"
 (흰 비단 환 ): "white silk"
 (환어 환 ): a kind of fish
(홀아버지 환 ): "bachelor"
 (두를 환 ): "to wrap around"
 (환할 환 )
 (세차게 흐를 환 ): "to flow violently"

As name element
One name containing this element, Young-hwan, was the 9th-most popular name for newborn South Korean boys in 1950. Other names containing this element include:

Ji-hwan
Jin-hwan
Joo-hwan
Jung-hwan
Kwang-hwan
Kyung-hwan
Myung-hwan
Seung-hwan
Young-hwan

See also
List of Korean family names
List of Korean given names

References

Korean-language surnames
Korean given names